Conservation in India can be traced to the time of Ashoka, tracing to the Ashoka Pillar Edicts as one of the earliest conservation efforts in the world. Conservation generally refers to the act of carefully and efficiently using natural resources. Conservation efforts begun in India before 5 AD, as efforts are made to have a forest administration. The Ministry of Environment, Forest and Climate Change is the ministry responsible for implementation of environmental and forestry program in India, which include the management of national parks, conservation of flora and fauna of India, and pollution controls.

History 
Yajnavalkya Smriti, a historic Indian text on statecraft and jurisprudence, suggested to have been written before the 5th century AD, prohibited the cutting of trees and prescribed punishment for such acts. During Chandragupta's reign, there was a regular forest department led by a Kupyadhyaksha (superintendent) and Vanpalas (forest guards). Kautilya's Arthashastra says that they had a role of classifying the trees, plants and herbs and fixing their price; they imposed fines on those who fell trees without permission.  It further mentions how forests were classified into three types: Reserved, those donated to Brahmins and public. Written in Mauryan period, it emphasised the need for forest administration. Ashoka went further, and his Pillar Edicts expressed his view about the welfare of environment and biodiversity.

Protected areas

As of May 2004, the protected areas of India cover 156,700 km², roughly 4.95% of the total surface area. These areas are used for in situ conservation, which involves conservation of species in their natural habitat.

Water Conservation
From the most dry regions to the wettest zones in the world, India has them all. Water is not just a natural resource but a political issue in most parts of the country. The Cauvery dispute between Karnataka-Tamil Nadu, Mahanadi dispute between Chhattisgarh-Orissa are a few examples of the tussle for water. The Tamil Nadu government's rainwater harvesting efforts  civil society movements such as Environmentalist Foundation of India (E.F.I's) community based lake/pond conservation efforts are seen as efforts to conserve water in India.

Endangered species

Some endangered species in the country were reintroduced via ex situ conservation. Ex-situ conservation is rearing or cultivating, including reintroducing, a plant or animal outside their natural habitat. The reintroduction of the Indian rhinoceros at the Dudhwa National Park was a form of ex-situ conservation; it was extinct in that area. Similarly the Gangetic gharial was reintroduced in Uttar Pradesh, Madhya Pradesh and Rajasthan.

Legislation
 Forest Rights Act
 Indian Forest Act, 1927
 Wild Life Protection Act, 1972, Amended 2003
 Wildlife Protection Act of 1972

Forests 

Ecological issues are an integral and important part of environmental issues challenging India. Poor air quality, water pollution and garbage pollution – all affect the food and environment quality necessary for ecosystems.

India is a large and diverse country. Its land area includes regions with some of the world's highest rainfall to very dry deserts, coast line to alpine regions, river deltas to tropical islands. The variety and distribution of forest vegetation is large. India is one of the 12 mega regions of the world.

Indian forests types include tropical evergreens, tropical deciduous, swamps, mangroves, sub-tropical, montane, scrub, sub-alpine and alpine forests. These forests support a variety of ecosystems with diverse flora and fauna.

Until recently, India lacked an objective way to determine the quantity of forests it had, and the quality of forests it had.
 Forest cover measurement methods
Prior to the 1980s, India deployed a bureaucratic method to estimate forest coverage. A land was notified as covered under Indian Forest Act, and then officials deemed this land area as recorded forest even if it was devoid of vegetation. Any comparison of forest coverage number of a year before 1987 for India, to current forest coverage in India, is thus meaningless; it is just bureaucratic record keeping, with no relation to reality or meaningful comparison. 

In the 1980s, space satellites were deployed for remote sensing of real forest cover. Standards were introduced to classify India's forests into the following categories:
 Forest Cover: defined as all lands, more than one hectare in area, with a tree canopy density of more than 10 percent. (Such lands may or may not be statutorily notified as forest area).
 Very Dense Forest: All lands, with a forest cover with canopy density of 70 percent and above
 Moderately Dense Forest: All lands, with a forest cover with canopy density of 40–70 percent
 Open Forest: All lands, with forest cover with canopy density of ten to forty percent
 Mangrove Cover: Mangrove forest is salt tolerant forest ecosystem found mainly in tropical and sub-tropical coastal and/or inter-tidal regions.  Mangrove cover is the area covered under mangrove vegetation as interpreted digitally from remote sensing data. It is a part of forest cover and also classified into three classes viz. very dense, moderately dense and open.
 Non Forest Land: defined as lands without any forest cover
 Scrub Cover: All lands, generally in and around forest areas, having bushes and or poor tree growth, chiefly small or stunted trees with canopy density less than 10 percent
 Tree Cover: Land with tree patches (blocks and linear) outside the recorded forest area exclusive of forest cover and less than the minimum mapable area of one hectare
 Trees Outside Forests: Trees growing outside Recorded Forest Areas
The first satellite recorded forest coverage data for India became available in 1987. India and the United States cooperated in 2001, using Landsat MSS with spatial resolution of 80 metres, to get accurate Indian forest distribution data. India thereafter switched to digital image and advanced satellites with 23 metres resolution and software processing of images to get more refined data on forest quantity and forest quality. India now assesses its forest distribution data biennially. The 2007 forest census data thus obtained and published by the Government of India suggests the five states with largest area under forest cover as the following:
 Madhya Pradesh: 7.64 million hectares
 Arunachal Pradesh: 6.8 million hectares
 Chhattisgarh: 5.6 million hectares
 Orissa: 4.83 million hectares
 Maharashtra: 4.68 million hectares
India hosts significant biodiversity; it is home to 7.6% of all mammalian, 12.6% of avian, 6.2% of reptilian, and 6.0% of flowering plant species.

In recent decades, human encroachment has posed a threat to India's wildlife; in response, a system of national parks and protected areas, first established in 1935, was substantially expanded. In 1972, India enacted the Wildlife Protection Act and Project Tiger to safeguard crucial habitat; further federal protections were promulgated in the 1980s. Along with over 500 wildlife sanctuaries, India now hosts 18 biosphere reserves, eleven of which are part of the World Network of Biosphere Reserves; 27 wetlands are registered under the Ramsar Convention.

These laws did not have the effect they intended.

In 1985, India created the Ministry of Environment and Forests. This was followed by a National Forest Policy and the major government reforms of the early 1990s.

Over the last 20 years, India has reversed the deforestation trend. Specialists of the United Nations report India's forest as well as woodland cover has increased. A 2010 study by the Food and Agriculture Organisation ranks India amongst the 10 countries with the largest forest area coverage in the world (the other nine being Russian Federation, Brazil, Canada, United States of America, China, Democratic Republic of the Congo, Australia, Indonesia and Sudan). India is also one of the top 10 countries with the largest primary forest coverage in the world, according to this study.

From 1990 to 2000, FAO finds India was the fifth largest gainer in forest coverage in the world; whilst from 2000 to 2010, FAO considers India as the third largest gainer in forest coverage.
 National Forest Commission and India's afforestation programme
In 2003, India set up a National Forest Commission to review and assess India's policy and law, its effect on India's forests, its impact of local forest communities, and to make recommendations to achieve sustainable forest and ecological security in India. The report made over 300 recommendations including the following:
 India must pursue rural development and animal husbandry policies to address local communities need to find affordable cattle fodder and grazing. To avoid destruction of local forest cover, fodder must reach these communities on reliable roads and other infrastructure, in all seasons year round.
 The Forest Rights Bill is likely to be harmful to forest conservation and ecological security. The Forest Rights Bill became a law since 2007.
 The government should work closely with mining companies. Revenue generated from lease of mines must be pooled into a dedicated fund to conserve and improve the quality of forests in the region where the mines are located.
 Power to declare ecologically sensitive areas must be with each Indian state.
 The mandate of State Forest Corporations and government owned monopolies must be changed.
 Government should reform regulations and laws that ban felling of trees and transit of wood within India. Sustainable agro-forestry and farm forestry must be encouraged through financial and regulatory reforms, particularly on privately owned lands.
India's national forest policy expects to invest US$26.7 billion by 2020, to pursue nationwide afforestation coupled with forest conservation, with the goal of increasing India's forest cover from 20% to 33%.

Notable organisations
 Bombay Natural History Society
 Environmentalist Foundation of India
 National Tiger Conservation Authority
 Nature Conservation Foundation
 Pragya
 WWF-India
 Wildlife Protection Society of India
 Wildlife Trust of India

Notable conservationists

 Dr KK Mohammed Koya Sea Cucumber Conservation Reserve
 Kenneth Anderson
 Chandi Prasad Bhatt
 Billy Arjan Singh
 Salim Ali
 Romulus Whitaker
 Arun Krishnamurthy
 A. J. T. John Singh
 Ashok Kumar (Founder, WTI)
 H. S. Panwar
 Atmaram Pandurang
 Sakharam Arjun
 Saad Bin Jung
 Meena Venkataraghavan
 Saroj R. Choudhury
 T. F. Bourdillon
 Jim Corbett
 K. Ullas Karanth
 Mysore Doreswamy Madhusudan
 Parbati Barua
 Snake Shyam
 Valmik Thapar
 Belinda Wright

See also
Appiko movement
Chipko movement
Conservation reserves and community reserves of India
Sálim Ali Centre for Ornithology and Natural History
Ralegan Siddhi
Arid Forest Research Institute (AFRI)

References